Xanthochromism (also called xanthochroism or xanthism), from the Greek xanthos (ξανθός) "yellow" and chroma (χρώμα) "color", is an unusually yellow pigmentation in an animal. It is often associated with the lack of usual red pigmentation and its replacement with yellow.  The cause is usually genetic but may also be related to the animal's diet.  A Cornell University survey of unusual-looking birds visiting feeders reported that 4% of such birds were described as xanthochromistic (compared with 76% albinistic).  The opposite of xanthochromism, a deficiency in or complete absence of yellow pigment, is known as axanthism.

Birds exhibiting genetic xanthochromism, especially deliberately bred mutations of several species of parrot in aviculture, are termed "lutinos".  Wild birds in which xanthochromism has been recorded include yellow wagtail, wood warbler, Cape May warbler, rose-breasted grosbeak, evening grosbeak, red-bellied woodpecker, scarlet tanager, northern cardinal, great spotted woodpecker, common tailorbird, crimson-breasted shrike, kakariki and kea.

See also 

 Albinism in biology
 Albinism
 Albino and white squirrels
 Amelanism
 Dyschromia
 Erythrism
 Heterochromia iridum
 Leucism
 Melanism
 Piebaldism
 Carotenosis

References
 Cornell University Project Feeder Watch 2002-2003 Accessed 19 March 2007.

External links 

 Birders’ World Magazine, August 2003
 Strange birds at your feeder
 Yellow-breasted Crimson-breasted Shrike

Genetic disorders with no OMIM
Disturbances of pigmentation
Bird health